"My Man" is the debut single by the Dutch girl group Luv', released in May 1977 by Philips/Phonogram Records. It appears on the 1978 album With Luv'.

Background
The song is Luv's very first commercially available single. In 1976, producers and songwriters Hans van Hemert and Piet Souer first recorded the music of a self-penned composition entitled "My Man" and were looking for female vocalists. They recruited José Hoebee, Marga Scheide and Patty Brard to form the girl group Luv'. The lyrics of this ABBA-esque track dealt with the death of a railroad man. It was a coincidence that around the time of its release, a taking of hostages happened in a train in De Punt in late May and early June 1977. 

The single charted in the Netherlands and Belgium. Luv' performed it on the Musikladen TV show broadcast on August 18, 1977, to promote it in the German-speaking countries. However, "My Man" failed to break into the charts in Germany, Austria and Switzerland.

Track listing and release

7" Vinyl
 a. "My Man"
 b. "Don't Let Me Down"

Charts

Year-end charts

References

1977 debut singles
Luv' songs
Songs written by Hans van Hemert
Songs written by Piet Souer
Phonogram Records singles
1977 songs
Philips Records singles
Private Stock Records singles